Angela Park (born August 25, 1988) is a Brazilian-American professional golfer who played on the LPGA Tour. She holds dual citizenship in Brazil and the United States.

Childhood and personal life
Park was born in Foz do Iguaçu, Paraná, Brazil to South Korean-born parents who had a business in Brazil. At the age of 8, she moved with her father and siblings to Torrance, California and spent the remainder of her childhood there where she attended Torrance High School. She states she has only been to Korea on holiday.

In June 2008 Park became a United States citizen. She also retains her Brazilian citizenship.

Amateur career
Park was successful in the American Junior Golf Association, winning five times. In 29 events in four seasons, she posted 24 top-10 finishes. She was also part of the Canon Cup and the USA Junior Solheim Cup. In 2005, she reached the semi-finals of the U.S. Women's Amateur, the premier amateur tournament for women golfers in the world.

Professional career
Deciding to forgo college, Park turned professional at age 17 in April 2006, competing on the Futures Tour, where she entered sixteen events. She earned full playing privileges on the LPGA for 2007 at the December 2006 LPGA Qualifying Tournament and was named LPGA Tour Rookie of the Year for 2007. Her best finish on the LPGA tour was a tie for runner-up as a rookie at the U.S. Women's Open, where she led after two rounds.

In October 2010, Park quit professional golf at age 22, claiming she was both mentally and physically exhausted although she has not ruled out the possibility of playing again.

Results in LPGA majors

LA = Low amateur
CUT = missed the half-way cut
WD = withdrew 
"T" = tied

Summary
Starts – 14
Wins – 0
2nd-place finishes – 1
3rd-place finishes – 1
Top 3 finishes – 2
Top 5 finishes – 3
Top 10 finishes – 3
Top 25 finishes – 5
Missed cuts – 4
Most consecutive cuts made – 5
Longest streak of top-10s – 2

LPGA Tour career summary

Team appearances
Professional
Lexus Cup (representing International team): 2007
World Cup (representing Brazil): 2008

References

External links

Angela Park profile on SeoulSisters.com

Brazilian female golfers
American female golfers
LPGA Tour golfers
Golfers from California
American sportspeople of Korean descent
Brazilian emigrants to the United States
Brazilian people of Korean descent
Sportspeople from Paraná (state)
People from Foz do Iguaçu
Sportspeople from Torrance, California
People from Cypress, California
1988 births
Living people
21st-century American women